Aguilera is a surname of Spanish origin.

The name is related to Latin Aquilaria (eagles lair). Surnames with similar spellings are Aguilar, Aguiler, Aguiar, Aquilar, etc.

Aguilera may refer to the following people:

 Aaron Aguilera, American professional wrestler
 Alberto Aguilera, Mexican singer better known as "Juan Gabriel"
 Brandon Aguilera (born 2003), Costa Rican footballer
 Carlos Aguilera, Uruguayan former footballer
 Carolina Aguilera, Chilean journalist
 Christina Aguilera (born 1980), American pop/R&B singer-songwriter
 Dave Aguilera, guitarist for Bleed the Dream
 Diego Marín Aguilera (died 1799), Spanish inventor
 Diego de Aguilar, Spanish Renaissance painter
 Edward Aguilera (born 1976), Spanish singer
 Francisco Vicente Aguilera (1821–1877), Cuban patriot
 Germán Sequeira Aguilera (1884-1951), Nicaraguan politician
 Jaime Roldós Aguilera (1940-1981), President of Ecuador
 Jorge Aguilera (born 1966), Cuban sprinter
 José Aguilera Bernabé, Spanish chess player
 Juan Aguilera (born 1962), Spanish tennis player
 Juan Miguel Aguilera (born 1960), Spanish fiction writer
 Marián Aguilera (born 1977), Spanish film/television actress
 Rick Aguilera (born 1961), American baseball player
 Ventura Ruiz Aguilera (1820–1881), Spanish poet